Kim Joo-ah (born January 4, 2004) is a South Korean actress. She is known for her roles in dramas The Cursed, Would You Like a Cup of Coffee?, and All of Us Are Dead. She also appeared in movies such as A Boy and Sungreen, LingLing, Almond: My Voice is Breaking, and Kim Min Young of the Report Card.

Biography and career 
Kim Joo-ah was born on January 4, 2004, in South Korea. In 2017 she joined Different Company and she made her debut as a child actress in film Glimmering. After her debut as an actress she appeared in several dramas and in a number of films including The Cursed, Would You Like a Cup of Coffee?, All of Us Are Dead and The Mentalist. She also appeared in several films Almond: My Voice is Breaking, Herstory, A Boy and Sungreen, LingLing and A Boy and Sungreen. She appeared in  film Kim Min Young of the Report Card as Yoo Jung-hee the movie was shown at 22nd Jeonju International Film Festival which received favorable reviews.

Filmography

Television series

Film

References

External links 
 
 

2004 births
Living people
21st-century South Korean actresses
South Korean television actresses
South Korean film actresses